Larga Nouă is a commune in Cahul District, Moldova. It is composed of two villages, Larga Nouă and Larga Veche.

References

Communes of Cahul District